Sugar Loaf railway station is a railway station in Powys, Wales, and is the most geographically remote station on the Heart of Wales Line. The line through here was opened by the Central Wales Extension Railway in 1868. The passing loop was removed when station was closed to passengers in 1965 but the station subsequently reopened to traffic in 1984.

The station's name in Welsh is Dinas y Bwlch; however, in Welsh station announcements, the station is referred to as Pen-y-fâl, the name given to the mountain of the same name in Monmouthshire.

Usage

The station sees very few passengers; in 2010/2011 an estimated 84 passengers used the station and in 2014 it was reported that the station was averaging five passengers per month. In 2017/2018 it increased its passenger usage by nearly 710% from the previous year, taking it to as many visitors in the year as the previous 17 years combined. Its low usage seemed to make it a popular attraction. In 2020, with rail passenger numbers in general affected by the COVID-19 pandemic, the station saw 156 passengers, followed by zero the following year. Between 6 July 2020 and 21 August 2021, trains did not call at the station due to the short platform and the inability to maintain social distancing between passengers and the guard when opening the train door.

This station is a request stop used mainly by trekkers and cyclists, since it is the nearest stop to the Sugar Loaf vantage point, although it was originally built to serve a number of cottages occupied by railway workers (such as signalmen and track gangers). The children of the workers travelled by train to school in Llanwrtyd Wells. The climb up to the summit here was a challenging one for train crews in steam days (especially northbound) and the use of banking locomotives was commonplace.

Facilities
The station has basic amenities only - a waiting shelter and timetable poster boards - although it has had a digital CIS display fitted.  There is no step-free access available, due to the station entrance being some distance from the nearest road (the A483) along a narrow path and in a cutting.

Services 
All trains serving the station are operated by Transport for Wales. There are four trains a day in each direction (towards Swansea and ) from Monday to Saturday, and two services on Sundays. Being a request stop, passengers have to give a hand signal to the approaching train driver to board or notify the guard when they board that they wish to alight from the train there.

References

Further reading

External links 

Railway stations in Powys
DfT Category F2 stations
Former London and North Western Railway stations
Railway stations in Great Britain opened in 1899
Railway stations in Great Britain closed in 1949
Railway stations in Great Britain opened in 1950
Railway stations in Great Britain closed in 1965
Railway stations in Great Britain opened in 1984
Heart of Wales Line
Railway stations served by Transport for Wales Rail
Railway request stops in Great Britain
Low usage railway stations in the United Kingdom
1899 establishments in Wales